Al Satwa is a community in Dubai, United Arab Emirates, comprising high-density retail outlets and private residential dwellings. It is located southwest of Bur Dubai and adjacent to Sheikh Zayed Road. Originally, its residents were mainly of the Baloch tribe. As the government provided better houses for emaratis staying here, only few Arabs are found residing here. Notable features include the Iranian Hospital, Satwa Grand Mosque and the Al Satwa bus terminal. Al Satwa is known for its large South Asian community, especially Filipino Nationals. It is often referred to as mini-Manila by Filipino community. E 11 (Sheikh Zayed Road) forms the southern boundary of Al Satwa, Jumeirah 1 borders its northern area.

Satwa is the subject of the critically acclaimed spoken word piece/photo-novella, Satwa stories, by Mahmoud Kaabour and Denise Holloway of Veritas Films. The project highlights the hidden gems and iconic characters of the Satwa neighborhood through poetry, photography, and music.

Jumeirah Garden City Proposal 

With the announcement of Jumeirah Garden City, the survival of this community is bleak. If the project goes through, the community will be razed to make way for part of the new development. Some soil testing has already been done for a few of the proposed buildings, most notably EP 09 Towers and 1 Park Avenue.

Parody Video

Police in November 2013 arrested a US citizen and some UAE citizens in connection with a YouTube parody video which allegedly portrayed Dubai in bad light. The parody video titled 'The Deadly Satwa GS' was shot in areas of Satwa and depicted gangs learning how to fight using simple weapons, including shoes, the aghal, etc.

External links 
 Youtube video of Satwa Stories performance June 2008
 Description of Satwa Stories by Veritas Films

References

Communities in Dubai